Mo'onia Frances Gerrard  (born 15 November 1980 in Bathurst, Australia) is a former Australian netball player of Tongan descent.  Her netball career commenced at a very young age; she would often participate in training sessions of her mother's senior Dee Why Beach Netball Club team. When she was old enough to register in a team, Gerrard commenced playing with Narrabeen Youth Club and was later selected to represent Manly Warringah Netball Association at State Age, State Championships and State League.  She was an Australian Institute of Sport scholarship holder. Gerrard is a current member of the Australian national team, and from 2011 is playing for the New South Wales Swifts in the ANZ Championship. She is the sister of Australian rugby union player Mark Gerrard.

Gerrard is also greatly admired for her dedication to the community, mentoring younger people, promoting healthy lifestyles and sporting and personal excellence, particularly in disadvantaged communities.  On 14 March 2013 the New South Wales Parliament's Legislative Council voted unanimously to commend Gerrard on her outstanding service to the community.

Domestic career
In the Commonwealth Bank Trophy, Gerrard played five years with the Sydney Sandpipers and during that time received the 1999 Best New Talent Award and shared the Player's Player Award in 2003.

Late 2003 saw the demise of Gerrard's Sandpipers team, so she relocated to cross-town rivals the Sydney Swifts. Gerrard's relocation was followed by a string of serious injuries, with an ankle injury keeping her out of the 2004 season, and a knee reconstruction curtailing her comeback in 2005. This knee reconstruction also prevented Gerrard from competing at the 2006 Commonwealth Games, in which Australia lost the gold-medal match to New Zealand.

Shortly after the 2007 Netball World Championships Gerrard announced that she was relocating from Sydney to play with the Adelaide Thunderbirds in the new ANZ Championship. Gerrard played three seasons with the Thunderbirds, reaching the playoffs in all three years and winning the championship in 2010.

Later in 2010, Gerrard announced that she will return to Sydney to play for the New South Wales Swifts.

In 2011, played her first season with the Swifts since 2007. At the ANZ Championship, Gerrard played her 50th ANZ Championship match against the West Coast Fever in round 4. Gerrard also played her 150th domestic match in round 5 against the Canterbury Tactix. Both of these matches were played in Sydney. In addition, Gerrard is currently the only Australian player to have her team in the finals series with the Thunderbirds (2008-2010) and the Swifts (2011).

International career
She was first selected in the Australian netball team to take on the Silver Ferns on Australian soil in November 2004. A series of injuries curtailed her participation in competitive netball throughout 2005, and forced her to miss the 2006 Commonwealth Games.

Gerrard made her comeback to competitive netball in 2006, and quickly fought her way back into the Australian team. Her strong defensive combination with Sydney Swifts teammate Liz Ellis played a major role in Australia reversing their losing streak against New Zealand in mid-2006, and Gerrard has laid claim to the goal defence position ever since.

In November 2007 Gerrard played a key role for Australia when it won the Netball World Championships beating New Zealand in Auckland. She missed the Diamond's inaugural World Netball Series campaign in 2009 with an ankle injury, but rejoined the national team for the 2010 Commonwealth Games in Delhi, winning silver. She also played at the 2011 World Netball Championships in Singapore, primarily as a wing defence. Gerrard has earned herself 68 Test Caps for Australia.

Netball career highlights
 2012-2013 NSW Swifts co-captain
 2011 World Championship gold medal (extra-time)
 2010 Commonwealth Games silver medallist (double extra-time)
 2010 Australian International Player of the Year
 2010 ANZ Championship premiership
 2008 Liz Ellis Diamond winner
 2006, 2007 Back to back titles with Sydney Swifts
 1998 Australian 21U netball team

References

External links
 2008 Adelaide Thunderbirds profile. Retrieved on 14 March 2009.

1980 births
Living people
Commonwealth Games silver medallists for Australia
Netball players at the 2010 Commonwealth Games
New South Wales Swifts players
Adelaide Thunderbirds players
Australian sportspeople of Tongan descent
Australian Institute of Sport netball players
Commonwealth Games medallists in netball
Australia international netball players
Recipients of the Medal of the Order of Australia
Recipients of the Australian Sports Medal
Sydney Swifts players
Sydney Sandpipers players
Netball Superleague coaches
Australian netball coaches
Netball players from New South Wales
Australian expatriate netball people in England
2007 World Netball Championships players
2011 World Netball Championships players
People from Bathurst, New South Wales
Medallists at the 2010 Commonwealth Games